Beeplant is a common name for several plants and may refer to:

Cleome, a genus of flowering plants, also known as spiderplants or spiderflowers
Borago officinalis, a species of flowering plant, also known as borage or starflower

See also
List of crop plants pollinated by bees